The original Maritime Junior A Hockey League was a Canadian Junior ice hockey league from 1968 until 1971 in the provinces of New Brunswick, Nova Scotia, and Prince Edward Island. The league competed for the Memorial Cup until 1970 when it was relegated to Tier II Junior A and then competed one year for the Centennial Cup before becoming defunct.

History
Founded in 1968, the MJAHL was meant to be the Atlantic answer to the Ontario Hockey Association and Western Canada Junior Hockey League. In 1970, when Junior A was split into Major Junior A and Tier II Junior A, the MJAHL was found on the Tier II side of things. The league lost interest without Memorial Cup eligibility and folded in 1971, right after the Charlottetown Islanders came within two games of claiming the 1971 Centennial Cup.

The creation of the league spawned competition in 1969 with the creation of the New Brunswick Junior Hockey League. Other leagues filled the gap of the league when it folded: the Island Junior Hockey League (1973–1991) in 1973 and the Metro Valley Junior Hockey League in 1977.

In 1991, the Maritime Junior A Hockey League was created through the merger of the aforementioned NBJHL, IJHL, and MVJHL as the NBJHL and MVJHL merged in 1983 and the IJHL joined the fold in 1991 to reconsolidate Maritime Junior A.

Of the team that played in the Original MJAHL, only the Moncton Beavers still exist under the name Edmundston Blizzard in the current MJAHL.

Teams
 Cape Breton Metros
 Charlottetown Islanders
 Dartmouth Lakers
 Halifax Atlantics/Canadiens
 Moncton Beavers

Champions
1969 Halifax Canadiens
1970 Charlottetown Islanders
1971 Charlottetown Islanders

National Playdowns
1969 Halifax Canadiens Lost Memorial Cup Eastern Quarter-final
Hull Beavers (CJHL) defeated Halifax Canadiens 4-games-to-3 in East Mem Cup Quarter-final
1970 Charlottetown Islanders Lost Memorial Cup Eastern Semi-final
Charlottetown Islanders defeated Fredericton Chevies (NBJHL) 3-games-to-1 in Atlantic Final
Charlottetown Islanders defeated Ottawa M&W Rangers (CJHL) 4-games-to-1 in East Mem Cup Quarter-final
Quebec Remparts (QMJHL) defeated Charlottetown Islanders 4-games-to-2 in East Mem Cup Semi-final
1971 Charlottetown Islanders Won Hewitt-Dudley Memorial Trophy, Lost Manitoba Centennial Cup Final
Charlottetown Islanders defeated Moncton Hawks (NBJHL) 4-games-to-none in East QF
Charlottetown Islanders defeated Thunder Bay Marrs (TBJHL) 4-games-to-1 in East SF
Charlottetown Islanders defeated Detroit Jr. Red Wings (SOJHL) 4-games-to-2 in East Final (Wins HDMT)
Red Deer Rustlers (AJHL) defeated Charlottetown Islanders 4-games-to-2 in Centennial Cup Final

External links
Current MJAHL Website

Maritime Junior Hockey League
Defunct ice hockey leagues in Prince Edward Island
Defunct ice hockey leagues in Nova Scotia
Defunct ice hockey leagues in New Brunswick
1968–69 in Canadian ice hockey by league
1969–70 in Canadian ice hockey by league
1970–71 in Canadian ice hockey by league